Chantal Thuy (born August 27, 1990) is a Canadian actress known for her role as Grace Choi in Black Lightning.

Early life and education 
Thuy was born and raised in Montreal, Quebec. Her parents are refugees from Vietnam, having fled the Vietnam War by boat and eventually arriving in Quebec. Her father is a former IBM engineer.

Thuy is a graduate of the Stella Adler Studio of Acting in New York City. She is fluent in English, French, and Vietnamese.

Career 
Thuy is known for her portrayal of the DC Comics character Grace Choi on the CW Network show Black Lightning (2018), which ran for four seasons. In October 2020, she was promoted to series regular on the series. Thuy has also appeared on television series like Madam Secretary, Pretty Little Liars and Matador.

In 2018, Thuy optioned Caroline Vu's novel, That Summer in Provincetown, about three generations of Vietnamese Canadians and is currently looking to adapt it into a screenplay.

In 2021, Thuy began portraying detective Lia Kaleo on the CBS action-crime drama series Magnum P.I..

Theater 

In February 2019, Thuy co-starred in Tracy Letts' play, Linda Vista, at the Mark Taper Forum in Los Angeles and later reprised her role on Broadway with the Second Stage Theater at the Helen Hayes Theatre.

Her theatre credits also include Pan Asian Repertory Theater's play "We Are", Harold Clurman Lab Theatre's "The Seagull" (Nina) and "Winter's Tale" (Perdita), and reading series with the Ma-Yi Lab Theatre, African American Playwrights Exchange and Teesri Duniya Theatre. She appeared as Marie Louise-Yvette L'Amour in the play "The Lady Was Gentleman" with the Broads' Word Ensemble in Los Angeles.

Personal life 

Thuy grew up Catholic but currently practices Buddhism under a Tibetan Buddhist teacher.

Filmography

Film

Television

References

External links

Actresses from Montreal
Canadian television actresses
Canadian Buddhists
Tibetan Buddhists from Canada
Living people
Canadian actresses of Vietnamese descent
1990 births